The Air Board was Canada's first governing body for aviation, operating from 1919 to 1923. The Canadian government established the Air Board by act of Parliament on June 6, 1919, with the purpose of controlling all flying within Canada. Canada was the first country to legislate and implement rules governing the entire domain of aviation.

Functions
The Air Board had three functions: devising a means of, and administering Canadian air defence; controlling and conducting all civil (non-military) government flying operations; and providing rules and regulations for flying within Canada, which included licensing, issuing air regulations and managing air traffic. The Board consisted of three sections: 1) the Department of the Controller of Civil Aviation which controlled all civil flying; 2) the Directorate of Flying Operations which controlled civil flying operations of the Air Board; and 3) the Headquarters of the Canadian Air Force (CAF), which operated at Camp Borden.

Stations
Several air stations were established for civil flying operations:

1. Naval Air Station Halifax, a former US Navy seaplane base used for fishery and forestry patrols, and aerial photography.

2. Roberval, Quebec, a seaplane base on Lac Saint-Jean used for forestry patrols and surveying.

3. Jericho Beach, British Columbia, used for fishery, forestry, anti-smuggling patrols.

4. Morley, Alberta, used for forestry patrols (later moved to High River, Alberta).

5. Rockcliffe, Ontario, used for photo surveying.

6. Victoria Beach, Manitoba, a seaplane base used for forestry patrols.

Members
List of members of the board from 1920:

 Arthur Sifton, Chairman 1919–1921 and Minister of Customs and Inland Revenue (Canada)
 Hugh Guthrie - Chairman 1921 - appointed to replace Sifton
 George Perry Graham - Chairman 1921–22 - appointed to replace Guthrie
 Oliver Mowat Biggar, Vice Chairman 1919–1922 and Judge Advocate General
 Sydney Chilton Mewburn, Member and Minister of Militia and Defence (Canada)
 Charles Ballantyne, Member and Minister of Naval Service
 Dr. Robert M. Coulter – Member and Deputy Postmaster General
 John Armistead Wilson, Member and Assistant Deputy Minister for Naval Service – later Controller of Civil Aviation with Department of National Defence and Transport Canada 1922–1941
 Edward S. Busby – Chief Inspector of Department of Customs and Inland Revenue]
Willoughby Gwatkin – Inspector General 1919–22

Operations staff
 Lieutenant Colonel Robert Leckie – Superintendent of Flying Operations
 Lieutenant Colonel James Stanley Scott – Superintendent of Certificates Branch
 Major Alexander Macdonald Shook – Secretary

Succession
In 1922 the Air Board, along with the former Department of Militia and Defence and the Department of Naval Service, was absorbed into the new Department of National Defence (DND). January 1, 1923, however, was set as the formal change-over date to allow time for reorganization. The CAF, which had been a small non-permanent air militia directed by the Air Board and originally formed to provide refresher flying training to veterans, was reorganized and became responsible for all Canadian flying operations including the control of civil aviation. The Royal Canadian Air Force (RCAF), which was created in 1924, would direct civil flying until 1927 when a Civil Aviation Branch was created within the DND. In November 1936 the  Civil Aviation Branch was transferred to the new Department of Transport, which would control all civil flying except for work directly related to defence.

See also
 Air Board (Australia)
 Canadian Aviation Corps
 History of aviation in Canada

Notes

References
Milberry, Larry, ed. Sixty Years—The RCAF and CF Air Command 1924–1984. Toronto: Canav Books, 1984. .
 Roberts, Leslie. There Shall Be Wings. Toronto: Clark, Irwin and Co. Ltd., 1959. No ISBN.

External links
 Canadian Military Aircraft Serial Numbers – The Air Board Years 1919 to 1927 (and beyond)
 The Canadian Air Board (pdf)

Military history of Canada
Aviation in Canada
1919 establishments in Canada
1923 disestablishments in Canada
Former Canadian federal departments and agencies
Government agencies established in 1919
Government agencies disestablished in 1923